South African Equestrian Federation (SAEF) is the national governing body for majority of equestrian sports in South Africa. These sports include the FEI-recognized disciplines of dressage, eventing, show jumping, vaulting, endurance, reining, para-equestrian, and driving, with the non-FEI discipline of tentpegging. SAEF also develops and enforces the rules for other events at horse shows.

SAEF governs the official relations with the International Federation for Equestrian Sports (FEI), with its affiliation established since 1947. It also oversee the interactions between the South African government with equestrian athletes and professionals. SAEF is registered with SASCOC as the officially recognised federation.

Disciplines 
Disciplines affiliated under the SAEF include:

 Carriage Driving SA 
 Dressage South Africa
 Endurance Association of SA
 Eventing South Africa
 Mounted Archery SA
 Equitation SA
 Mounted Games SA
 SA Polo Association
 SA Polocrosse Association 
 SA Showjumping
 SA Tentpegging Association 
 SA Western Mounted Games
 SA Showing
 SA Vaulting Association

Equestrians

See also
 Sport in South Africa

References

External links
 SAEF official website
 SAEF Partner Links

National members of the International Federation for Equestrian Sports
Equestrian
Saddle seat
Hunt seat
Dressage
Eventing
Show jumping
Equestrian sports in South Africa
Para Dressage